Oryza sativa, commonly known as Asian rice or indica rice, is the plant species most commonly referred to in English as rice. It is the type of farmed rice whose cultivars are most common globally, and was first domesticated in the Yangtze River basin in China 13,500 to 8,200 years ago.

Oryza sativa belongs to the genus Oryza of the grass family Poaceae. With a genome consisting of 430Mbp across 12 chromosomes, it is renowned for being easy to genetically modify and is a model organism for the botany of cereals.

Classification

Oryza sativa contains two major subspecies: the sticky, short-grained japonica or sinica variety, and the nonsticky, long-grained   rice variety. Japonica was domesticated in the Yangtze Valley 9–6,000 years ago, and its varieties can be cultivated in dry fields (it is cultivated mainly submerged in Japan), in temperate East Asia, upland areas of Southeast Asia, and high elevations in South Asia, while indica was domesticated around the Ganges 8,500-4,500 years ago, and its varieties are mainly lowland rices, grown mostly submerged, throughout tropical Asia. Rice occurs in a variety of colors, including white, brown, black, purple, and red rices. Black rice (also known as purple rice) is a range of rice types, some of which are glutinous rice. Varieties include Indonesian black rice and Thai jasmine black rice.

A third subspecies, which is broad-grained and thrives under tropical conditions, was identified based on morphology and initially called javanica, but is now known as tropical japonica. Examples of this variety include the medium-grain 'Tinawon' and 'Unoy' cultivars, which are grown in the high-elevation rice terraces of the Cordillera Mountains of northern Luzon, Philippines.

Glaszmann (1987) used isozymes to sort O. sativa into six groups: japonica, aromatic, indica, aus, rayada, and ashina.

Garris et al. (2004) used simple sequence repeats to sort O. sativa into five groups: temperate japonica, tropical japonica and aromatic comprise the japonica varieties, while indica and aus comprise the indica varieties.

Nomenclature and taxonomy 
Rice has been cultivated since ancient times and oryza is a classical Latin word for rice while sativa means "cultivated".

Genetics 
/ is a gene that regulates the overall architecture/growth habit of the plant. Some of its epialleles increase rice yield. An accurate and usable Simple Sequence Repeat marker set was developed and used to generate a high-density map in McCouch et al., 2002. A multiplex high-throughput marker assisted selection system has been developed by Masouleh et al., 2009 but as with other crop HTMAS systems has proven difficult to customize, costly (both directly and for the equipment), and inflexible. Other molecular breeding tools have produced results, producing blast resistant cultivars. Xu et al., 2014 uses a DNA microarray to substantially advance understanding of hybrid vigor in rice, Takagi et al., 2013 uses QTL sequencing to elucidate seedling vigor, and Yano et al., 2016 performs a GWAS by WGS to investigate various agronomic traits. (Because the correspondence between genotype and phenotype is more easily understood in rice, translation of results from rice to other non-models may require more work. For example grain size and grain weight in wheat were elucidated in this way by Valluru et al., 2014.) Affymetrix offers a 44 thousand pot microarray, a 50 thousand, and a one million, and Illumina has a six thousand and a 50 thousand, all of which have performed well and are commonly used. Rice is one of the earliest uses and validation models for the semi-thermal asymmetric reverse PCR (STARP) method developed in Long et al., 2016.

In total 641 copy number variations are known, the combination of results of Ma and Bennetzen 2004 and Yu et al., 2011. Exome capture often reveals new single nucleotide polymorphisms in rice, due to its large genome and high degree of DNA repetition. There have been two major results of this type, Saintenac et al., 2011 and Henry et al., 2014.

Both abscisic acid and salicylic acid are employed by O. sativa in its regulation of its own immune responses. Jiang et al., 2010 finds SA broadly upregulates and ABA broadly downregulates immunity to Magnaporthe grisea, and success depends on the balance between their levels.

Breeding

A triple introgression of resistance genes against Magnaporthe grisea—and actual field resistance—have been demonstrated by Khan et al., 2018. This is a marker-assisted backcross of Pi1, Pi54, and Pita into an aromatic cultivar using SSR- and STS-markers.

Gallery

See also
 Black rice
 Domesticated plants and animals of Austronesia
 International Code of Nomenclature for Cultivated Plants
 Japonica rice
 Maratelli rice
 Oryza glaberrima (African rice)
 Traceability of genetically modified organisms

References

External links

sativa
Crops originating from Asia
Flora of China
Plants described in 1753
Rice
Taxa named by Carl Linnaeus